Sphingomonas aerophila  is a Gram-negative and aerobic bacteria from the genus of Sphingomonas which has been isolated from air from the Jeju Island in Korea.

References

Further reading

External links
Type strain of Sphingomonas aerophila at BacDive -  the Bacterial Diversity Metadatabase

aerophila
Bacteria described in 2014